Dr Anthony Trueman is a fictional character from the BBC soap opera EastEnders, played by British actor Nicholas Bailey. He made his first appearance in the episode broadcast on 11 December 2000 and left in 2003 but returned in 2004 and 2005 for brief stints such as the wedding of Yolande Duke (Angela Wynter) and Patrick Trueman (Rudolph Walker). Anthony made a brief return on 22 July 2014 following Patrick's stroke.

Storylines
Anthony is the younger son of Patrick (Rudolph Walker) and Audrey Trueman (Corinne Skinner-Carter)  and the brother of Paul Trueman (Gary Beadle). He is the brains of an otherwise dysfunctional family, and his dodgy-dealing brother Paul always feels under his shadow. Anthony works as a doctor in the Square. Audrey becomes deeply involved with his life, whilst ignoring Paul. She disapproves of Anthony dating Kat Slater (Jessie Wallace) and tries to interfere many times, leading to Anthony rebelling against his mother. When Audrey dies, Anthony's long lost father, Patrick, arrives for Audrey's funeral, reuniting with his two sons after decades apart. After a period of adjustment, the Trueman brothers accept Patrick; however, Paul grows suspicious of him and secretly performs a DNA test, where it is revealed that although Anthony is Patrick's biological son, Paul is not.

After Kat breaks up with Anthony, he and Kat's teenage daughter Zoe Slater (Michelle Ryan) begin an affair. Zoe disowns Kat for disapproving of their relationship, and later runs away when Anthony reveals that he is still in love with Kat. Anthony and Kat's relationship resumes, but Zoe returns and catches them in bed together. Zoe then accepts they are together. After Kat fails to impress Anthony's colleagues she breaks up with him as he is about to propose. Kat discovers she is pregnant by him and decides to have an abortion. Her boss Alfie Moon (Shane Richie) persuades her not to, but she suffers a miscarriage while on her way to tell Anthony of the pregnancy. Kat then breaks up with Anthony again after realising he is not who she wants. In 2003, when Anthony causes the death of a pregnant patient, he leaves the Square to go travelling, but returns for Patrick's wedding to Yolande Duke (Angela Wynter) and Paul's funeral.

After living in Cambodia for several years, Anthony returns to the UK and settles in Glasgow, marries a woman named Sophie and has children. In 2013, Patrick falls from a ladder and considers staying with Anthony but decides not to. In 2014, Anthony is featured in a medical journal, in an article about his work in Cambodia, a copy of which Patrick buys. After hearing about Patrick's stroke, he returns to Walford, though Patrick mistakes him for Paul. Despite feeling obliged to take care of his father, Anthony admits he cannot forgive Patrick's absence during his childhood. He writes Denise Fox (Diane Parish) a cheque for £2000 to help look after Patrick and returns to Scotland.
In 2020, while the show is offscreen, he returned to look after Patrick in hospital after he contracted COVID-19 during the pandemic. He later invited Patrick and Sheree to stay with him during lockdown and the pair make amends.

Creation and development
In early 2000, it was announced that a new doctor would arrive in EastEnders. A few days later it was announced he would be played by Nick Bailey. Bailey was working for an investment bank unloading boxes, when he received the call about auditioning for Anthony. He explained "I was alone in the stockroom when my agent's wife rang and told me I'd got the part. I just jumped up and punched the air, then did a rumba round the room." EastEnders marked Bailey's first major television role. Anthony was introduced as the son of B&B owner Audrey Trueman (Corinne Skinner-Carter). He made his first on-screen appearance on 11 December 2000. It was later announced his family would arrive later in the year.

In December 2002, it was announced that Anthony will begin a relationship with Kat Slater (Jessie Wallace). "Kat and Alfie is a romance just waiting to happen and we don't have to wait long," an insider told The People today. "Bosses are convinced they will become the next Den and Angie." Kat, who has only just rekindled her love with her daughter's former fiancé Anthony Trueman, will ditch him after embarrassing herself at a dinner party the Doc has taken her to.

"Kat and Anthony's romance has been on-off from day one," the insider added. "Kat first realises she has a thing for Alfie when he coaches her on table etiquette before the big date. And after the night goes pear-shaped she flings herself at Alfie saying, 'Anthony is not the man for me'. Alfie, who's fancied Kat since he gave her barmaid's job, is delighted. They kiss and soon become a serious item."

Bailey reprised his role in July 2014 for one episode. Anthony returned to Walford following his father's stroke. In 2015, Bailey stated that his return in 2014 was confusing, saying, "Anthony was always a man of duty and responsibility so I don't know why he would abandon his father. It was never explained to me and it was all a bit surreal. I'm baffled myself, but then EastEnders now doesn't resemble the show I was in."

In popular culture
The character of Anthony Trueman has been spoofed in the cartoon sketch show 2DTV.

References

External links

Fictional Black British people
EastEnders characters
Fictional physicians
Television characters introduced in 2000
Male characters in television